Kamilė Nacickaitė (born 28 December 1989) is a Lithuanian professional female basketball player, currently playing for Galatasaray in Turkey.

Club career
On 11 August 2022, she signed with Galatasaray of the Turkish Women's Basketball Super League (TKBL).

National team career
She reached the quarter-finals with Lithuanian national team in EuroBasket Women 2015.

Drexel statistics
Source

References

External links
Profile at Eurobasket.com
Profile at EuroBasket Women 2015

1989 births
Living people
Drexel Dragons women's basketball players
Fenerbahçe women's basketball players
Lithuanian expatriate basketball people in the United States
Lithuanian women's basketball players
Sportspeople from Šiauliai
Small forwards
Shooting guards
Galatasaray S.K. (women's basketball) players
Nesibe Aydın GSK players